Luxembourg is a landlocked country in western Europe. It is bordered by Belgium to the west and north, Germany to the east, and France to the south. Luxembourg is a founding member of the European Union, OECD, United Nations, NATO, and Benelux, reflecting its political consensus in favour of economic, political, and military integration. The city of Luxembourg, which is the country's capital and largest city, is the seat of several institutions and agencies of the EU. Luxembourg served on the United Nations Security Council for the years 2013 and 2014, which was a first in the country's history. In 2016 Luxembourgish citizens had visa-free or visa-on-arrival access to 172 countries and territories, ranking the Luxembourgian passport 6th in the world, tied with countries such as Canada and Switzerland.

Largest firms 
This list shows firms in the Fortune Global 500, which ranks firms by total revenues reported before March 31, 2017. Only the top five firms (if available) are included as a sample.

Notable firms 
This list includes notable companies with primary headquarters located in the country. The industry and sector follow the Industry Classification Benchmark taxonomy. Organizations which have ceased operations are included and noted as defunct.

See also 
 Economy of Luxembourg
 Business entity types in Luxembourg

References 

Luxembourg